Rosie Jones (born 24 June 1990) is a British comedian, writer and actress. She has written for panel shows Harry Hill's Alien Fun Capsule, Would I Lie to You?, The Last Leg and 8 Out of 10 Cats Does Countdown, and has appeared as a guest on The Last Leg, 8 Out of 10 Cats, 8 Out of 10 Cats Does Countdown, QI and Hypothetical. Jones has performed stand-up comedy at the Edinburgh Festival Fringe, incorporating her cerebral palsy into her comedic style; in 2018, she was featured on Edinburgh Nights.

Jones has also appeared on other television shows, written an episode of Sex Education and hosts the podcast Daddy Look at Me with Helen Bauer. She attended the 2020 Summer Paralympics in Tokyo as a roving reporter for The Last Leg.

As an actress, she appeared in six episodes of Casualty between 2021 and 2022. She is also the author of a children's book, The Amazing Edie Eckhart, about an 11-year-old girl with cerebral palsy.

Early life 
Jones grew up in Bridlington and went to Headlands School.

Career 
In 2011, following her graduation with a first-class degree from the 
University of Huddersfield,
Jones was hired for a year as a junior researcher for Objective Media Group as part of a disability scheme at Channel 4. She was unemployed for a few years following this. In January 2015, Jones began a screenwriting class at the National Film and Television School. Jones reached the final of the 2016 Funny Women Awards. She began writing for The Last Leg during their coverage of the 2016 Summer Olympics. Jones has also written for Harry Hill's Alien Fun Capsule, Would I Lie to You? and 8 Out of 10 Cats Does Countdown.

In 2017, Jones appeared on 8 Out of 10 Cats. In 2018, Jones appeared in Silent Witness and on The Last Leg. In 2019, Jones was a guest on Hypothetical and 8 Out of 10 Cats Does Countdown, and again on 8 Out of 10 Cats and The Last Leg. She has also appeared on the podcast The Guilty Feminist, the Channel 4 online programme The Last Leg: The Correspondents, the BBC Three series "Things Not to Say", BBC Radio 4's Fred at the Stand and BBC web series Period Dramas.

In June 2019, Jones launched a new podcast alongside fellow comedian Helen Bauer entitled Daddy Look at Me. The podcast features Bauer, Jones and a guest discussing their childhoods and what they did in order to get attention in their youth.

In 2020, Jones guest starred in an episode of the third series of the BBC drama Shakespeare & Hathaway: Private Investigators. and on BBC Radio 4's The News Quiz, presented by Nish Kumar. She also appeared on an episode of Joe Lycett's Got Your Back.

Alongside series creator Laurie Nunn, Jones co-wrote episode four of the second season of the Netflix comedy-drama Sex Education, released in January 2020.

Jones appeared as a panellist on BBC One's Question Time on 12 November 2020.

In May 2021, Jones starred in her own Channel 4 series, Trip Hazard: My Great British Adventure. Filmed during the Covid-19 pandemic, it features Jones visiting a number of UK tourist destinations, joined by other celebrities. In March 2022, a second series of five hour-long episodes was commissioned; it premiered on 23 August 2022. Also in 2021, Jones appeared in the QI episode "Sideshows, Stunts and Scavenger Hunts".

In 2021, Jones authored a children's novel, The Amazing Edie Eckhart. The titular character, an 11-year-old girl with cerebral palsy, deals with the pressure of entering secondary school and becoming distant from her lifelong friend and support Charlie. Jones wrote a sequel novel, The Big Trip, which was published on 18 August 2022.

In March 2022, Channel 4 commissioned Dine Hard, a five-part cooking show and chat show that Jones will present. At the same time, they announced a one-off documentary starring Jones about societal prejudices against disabled people.

Stand-up comedy
Jones first performed stand-up comedy without preparation at a friend's comedy night.

In 2017, Jones performed "Inspiration" at the Edinburgh Festival Fringe. The show was 35 minutes long and contained jokes about her visit to the 2016 Summer Paralympics, using disabled toilets, and commentary on the words "disabled" and "spastic". It received 3.5 stars in Chortle and three stars in The List. Metro listed her as one of "9 hilarious women to look out for in 2017".

In 2018, Jones' Edinburgh Festival Fringe show was entitled "Fifteen Minutes". Jones talks about a hypothetical "able-bodied Rosie" and discusses a sexual fantasy about Ryan Gosling. She and her routine were featured in Edinburgh Nights, a BBC show about the Fringe presented by Nish Kumar. "Fifteen Minutes" received five stars in The Arts Desk and four stars in iNews, Chortle, The Scotsman and Broadway World. It was listed by Evening Standard as one of the ten "best comedy shows to see" at the festival.

Jones performed at the Greenwich Comedy Festival in 2018. In 2019, Jones performed at Spectacular, a one-off event for Comic Relief, and appeared at the 2019 Women of the World Festival. She has also been a support act for Nish Kumar.

Comedic style
Jones has ataxic cerebral palsy; she incorporates her slow speech pattern into her comedy, constructing jokes to subvert the punchline that audiences expect. For instance, she has used the opening line "As you can tell from my voice, I suffer from being northern." Jones unexpectedly refers to previous jokes later in her performances, a trait which one critic describes as "clinically planned".

She describes her style as "cheeky", commenting that she makes jokes that able-bodied people could not. Jones' stand-up routines relate to disability and sexuality, and have been described as dark comedy.

In 2019, Jones received mixed reception for a joke she made on The Last Leg in which she said that as a 16-year-old, environmental activist Greta Thunberg should only be concerned with "drinking Lambrini and getting fingered."

Personal life
Jones is a lesbian. On the BBC Sounds podcast Duvet Days, she said "Growing up, there was nobody in TV or radio that looked like me – that sounded like me. There was Francesca Martinez in Grange Hill, but that was the only person really. And also my sexuality came into that, like when there was a disabled person they were very much the victim and they didn’t have a sexuality, they were very much the stock disabled person. That meant growing up, I didn’t accept my sexuality because I thought I’m not gay and disabled."

Jones has spoken on the rights of disabled people, describing bullying that she has experienced and difficulties in her daily life. She's expressed concerns over the particular vulnerability of disabled people during the COVID-19 pandemic, and the way emphasis on the virus affecting people with pre-existing conditions has led to disabled people being coded as "second class citizens". During an interview with The Guardian, Jones commented: "I would love in the next few years to see more disabled comedians, directors, producers, commissioners. I hope disabled people can see me on TV and think: if she can do it, I can do it."

References

External links

1990 births
Living people
21st-century English comedians
21st-century British screenwriters
21st-century English women writers
Actors with disabilities
British people with disabilities
British stand-up comedians
British television writers
British women comedians
English female screenwriters
English lesbian writers
English lesbian actresses
English LGBT comedians
English LGBT screenwriters
Lesbian comedians
Lesbian screenwriters
20th-century English LGBT people
21st-century English LGBT people
People from Bridlington
People with cerebral palsy
British women television writers
Writers with disabilities
Television presenters with disabilities
Alumni of the University of Huddersfield